Andrius Šležas (born February 4, 1975) is a Lithuanian former professional basketball player and basketball coach. During his playing career, he was best known as a 3-point specialist.

Professional playing career
Šležas was named the Lithuanian League's Finals MVP in 2006.

Coaching career
Šležas began his coaching career in 2014.

References
  Andrius Šležas. LKL (Lithuanian Basketball League).

External links
Eurobasket.com Profile

1975 births
Living people
BC Rytas players
Lithuanian men's basketball players
People from Joniškis
Power forwards (basketball)
Small forwards